Yohel Enrique Pozo (born June 14, 1997) is a Venezuelan professional baseball catcher and designated hitter in the Oakland Athletics organization. He made his Major League Baseball (MLB) debut in 2021 for the Texas Rangers.

Career

Texas Rangers
Pozo played for Venezuela in the 2009 Little League World Series. Pozo signed as an international free agent with the Texas Rangers on August 17, 2013, for a $100,000 signing bonus. Pozo spent the 2014 and 2015 seasons with the DSL Rangers of the Rookie-level Dominican Summer League; hitting .273/.329/.333/.662 with 29 RBI in 2014, and .272/.335/.354/.689 with 1 home run and 24 RBI in 2015. He spent the 2016 season with the AZL Rangers of the Rookie-level Arizona League, hitting .343/.382/.448/.829 with 1 home run and 22 RBI. Pozo split the 2017 season between the Spokane Indians of the Class A Short Season Northwest League and the Hickory Crawdads of the Class A South Atlantic League, hitting a combined .323/.351/.478/.828 with 4 home runs and 25 RBI. Pozo spent the 2018 season back with Hickory, hitting .264/.312/.411/.723 with 10 home runs and 49 RBI. His 2019 season was spent with the Down East Wood Ducks of the Class A-Advanced Carolina League, where he hit .246/.274/.357/.631 with 9 home runs and 43 RBI. Pozo did not play in 2020, with the cancelation of the minor league season due to the COVID 19 pandemic.

Pozo became a free agent following the 2020 season, and signed a minor league contract with the San Diego Padres. Pozo returned to Texas, when on December 10, 2020, he was selected by the Rangers in the minor league phase of the 2020 Rule 5 draft.

Pozo spent the 2021 minor league season with the Round Rock Express of the Triple-A West, hitting .337/.352/.622/.974 with 23 home runs and 74 RBI over 77 games. On August 13, 2021, Texas selected his contract and promoted him to the active roster. That night versus the Oakland Athletics, he made his major league debut. That night, recorded his first career hit off Cole Irvin, and his first MLB home run off Sergio Romo. Over 21 game for Texas in 2021, Pozo hit .284/.312/.378/.690 with 1 home run and 9 RBI.

On November 30, 2021, Pozo was non-tendered by the Rangers, making him a free agent. He re-signed with Texas on a minor league contract the next day. Appearing in just 65 games for Round Rock in 2022, Pozo hit .320/.352/.474/.826 with 6 home runs and 38 RBI. He elected free agency on November 10, 2022.

Oakland Athletics
On December 13, 2022, Pozo signed a minor league contract with an invitation to spring training with the Oakland Athletics.

Legal troubles
Pozo and upwards of seven other Rangers prospects were investigated by Dominican Republic police, in regards to a 2016 incident where video was uploaded to Snapchat, purporting to show the sexual assault of a Rangers minor league player. Pozo was suspended while the investigation was pending, but was not charged with any crimes.

Personal life
Pozo's father, also named Yohel, played five seasons of minor league baseball in the Colorado Rockies organization.

See also
List of Major League Baseball players from Venezuela
Rule 5 draft results

References

External links

1997 births
Living people
Sportspeople from Maracaibo
Venezuelan expatriate baseball players in the United States
Major League Baseball players from Venezuela
Major League Baseball catchers
Major League Baseball designated hitters
Texas Rangers players
Dominican Summer League Rangers players
Venezuelan expatriate baseball players in the Dominican Republic
Arizona League Rangers players
Spokane Indians players
Hickory Crawdads players
Down East Wood Ducks players
Round Rock Express players